Mohamed Kamara (born 16 November 1987), widely known as Medo, is a Sierra Leonean professional footballer who plays as a defensive midfielder for Gnistan and Sierra Leone national team. He also holds Finnish citizenship.

Early life
Kamara was born in Port Loko and raised in Bo, Sierra Leone. Both of his parents were said to have been killed during the civil war in Sierra Leone. However, this is a claim that has since been denied by Kamara himself.

Club career

Early career
Kamara started playing football in his school at the age of seven. His older brother, Kemoh Kamara, was teaching in the school and also taught football. At the age of 12, Kamara joined his first club, Sierra Rangers. His football career took a great step forward after signing for top division club Kallon in 2002.

Career in Finland

After playing for the national youth selection in Finland, Kamara escaped along with several teammates from their accommodation and applied for asylum. After he got asylum, Kamara was ineligible to play professional football until his 18th birthday. During the waiting period, he trained with LehPa-77 in Kontiolahti. Kamara signed his first contract with Veikkausliiga club KuPS before the 2006 season. After a season and relegation with the Kuopio-based club, he moved to HJK in the Finnish capital.

In his first year with HJK, Kamara played in every league match and was voted for the club MVP of the season. In March 2008, he signed a new three-year contract, which would keep him with HJK until the end of the 2010. In April 2010, Kamara signed a contract extension at HJK to stay with the Finnish champions until June 2011. On 30 August 2010, he played his farewell match for HJK, in a 3–1 victory against IFK Mariehamn.

Despite the fact that he left HJK before the end of the season, Kamara was awarded for the 2010 Veikkausliiga Player of the Year.

Partizan
On 31 August 2010, a day after his last match for HJK, Kamara signed a three-year contract with Serbian side Partizan. He was presented with together with Pierre Boya. Kamara made his debut for the club on 4 September 2010 in a home fixture against Hajduk Kula. He played for the full duration of the match as Hajduk were beaten 2–0. Kamara also made five appearances in the 2010–11 UEFA Champions League group stage.

Bolton Wanderers

On 31 January 2013, Kamara signed for English Championship club Bolton Wanderers on a three-and-a-half-year contract for an undisclosed fee, subject to international clearance. His debut came on 23 February as he came on as a substitute in Bolton's 4–1 win versus Hull City. His first goal for the club came on 30 March against Charlton Athletic as he scored Bolton's second in a 2–3 defeat.

On 19 January 2015, Kamara was officially loaned to Maccabi Haifa for the remainder of the 2014–15 season.

After returning from loan to Bolton, Kamara failed to make any competitive appearance for the club, before being released by mutual agreement in January 2016.

Return to HJK
In March 2016, Kamara returned to his former club HJK.

Kazma
On 31 January 2019 it was confirmed, that Kamara had signed for another Kuwaiti side, Kazma SC in the Kuwait Premier League. Kamara had been without club for six months since his departure from Kuwait SC.

International career
Internationally, Kamara played for the Sierra Leonean under-17 team that finished runner-up of the 2003 African U-17 Championship in Swaziland. He was also a member of the same team at the 2003 FIFA U-17 World Championship in Finland.

After spending seven years in Finland, Kamara has expressed his wish to play for the Finnish national team, but FIFA ruled this out as they rejected his application to play for Finland in December 2010. After FIFA's decision, Kamara announced his availability for the Sierra Leonean national team and was subsequently called up to face Niger on 27 March 2011. Finally, Kamara debuted for his homeland in that match playing the full 90 minutes.

Statistics

Club

International

International goals
Scores and results list Sierra Leone's goal tally first.

Honours
KuPS
 Finnish League Cup: 2006

HJK
 Veikkausliiga: 2009
 Finnish Cup: 2008

Partizan
 Serbian SuperLiga: 2010–11, 2011–12
 Serbian Cup: 2010–11

Individual
 Veikkausliiga Player of the Year: 2010
 Serbian SuperLiga Team of the Season: 2011–12

References

External links

 
 
 
 
 

1987 births
Living people
Finnish people of Sierra Leonean descent
Naturalized citizens of Finland
Sierra Leonean footballers
Sierra Leone international footballers
Sierra Leonean expatriate footballers
Association football midfielders
People from Port Loko District
People from Bo, Sierra Leone
Bolton Wanderers F.C. players
FK Partizan players
Kuopion Palloseura players
Maccabi Haifa F.C. players
Helsingin Jalkapalloklubi players
Kuwait SC players
Kazma SC players
FC Haka players
Kuwait Premier League players
Serbian SuperLiga players
English Football League players
Veikkausliiga players
Israeli Premier League players
Expatriate footballers in England
Expatriate footballers in Finland
Expatriate footballers in Israel
Expatriate footballers in Serbia
Expatriate footballers in Kuwait
Sierra Leonean expatriate sportspeople in England
Sierra Leonean expatriate sportspeople in Finland
Sierra Leonean expatriate sportspeople in Israel
Sierra Leonean expatriate sportspeople in Serbia
Sierra Leonean expatriate sportspeople in Kuwait
2021 Africa Cup of Nations players